The Confederate Memorial Park is a monument located in Tampa, Florida. The monument, which stands close to the intersection of I-4 and I-75,  featured a large  Confederate battle flag, which can be seen from the intersection.

History 

The park was opened in 2008 and was funded by the Sons of Confederate Veterans. The park featured a large 60-by-30-foot (18.3 m × 9.1 m) Confederate battle flag, which is claimed to be the 2nd largest Confederate flag in the world. During the anti-racist riots following the 2020 murder of George Floyd, the flag was removed after threats to burn it were made on social media. It was later reinstalled. Currently, the park flies the national flag of the Confederate States, distinct from the  Confederate Battle flag.

References 

Parks in Tampa, Florida
2008 establishments in Florida
Confederate States of America monuments and memorials in Florida
Buildings and structures in Tampa, Florida
Sons of Confederate Veterans